Tomopenem (formerly CS-023) is a carbapenem β-lactam antibiotic.

References
 Efficacy of human-simulated exposures of tomopenem (formerly CS-023) in a murine model of Pseudomonas aeruginosa and methicillin-resistant Staphylococcus aureus infection

Carboxamides
Carbapenem antibiotics
Guanidines
Pyrrolidines